"Radio" is a song by British pop singer Robbie Williams, co-written by William and Stephen Duffy. It was the first single from Williams' compilation album Greatest Hits, released in 2004. Williams wrote the song's distinctive synth-pop melody by attempting (and failing) to play Harold Faltermeyer's "Axel F" on an electronic keyboard, from memory. "Radio" is Williams's first solo outing without the involvement of long-time producer and co-writer Guy Chambers, and is particularly notable as Williams's last UK number-one for eight years, until 2012's "Candy".

Chart performance
"Radio" became Robbie Williams' sixth number-one single on the UK Singles Chart, selling 41,734 copies during its first week. The song was Williams's last UK number-one for eight years until "Candy" took the top spot in November 2012. "Radio" also topped the Danish Singles Chart and reached the top 10 across Europe, peaking at number one on the Eurochart Hot 100. In Australia, the single charted at number 12, and after seven weeks on the charts, the single was certified gold.

Track listings

UK CD1 and European CD single
 "Radio"
 "Radio" (Maloney Mix)

UK CD2
 "Radio"
 "Northern Town"
 "Radio" (Sam La More Jumpin' Radio Mix)
 Gallery and video clips

UK DVD single
 "Radio" (video)
 "1974" (audio)
 "Radio" (Massey Mix audio)
 Gallery and video clips

Australian CD single
 "Radio"
 "Northern Town"
 "Radio" (Sam La More Jumpin' Radio Mix)

Credits and personnel
Credits are taken from the Greatest Hits album booklet.

Studio
 Mastered at Metropolis Mastering (London, England)

Personnel

 Robbie Williams – writing, lead vocals, synthesiser
 Stephen Duffy – writing, guitars, synthesiser, drums production
 Gavyn Wright – string leader
 Claire Worrall – string arrangement
 Nick Littlemore – additional programming
 Andy Strange – production
 Bob Clearmountain – mixing
 Tony Cousins – mastering

Charts

Weekly charts

Year-end charts

Certifications

References

Robbie Williams songs
2004 singles
2004 songs
Chrysalis Records singles
European Hot 100 Singles number-one singles
Music videos directed by Vaughan Arnell
Number-one singles in Denmark
Number-one singles in Scotland
Songs about radio
Songs written by Robbie Williams
Songs written by Stephen Duffy
UK Singles Chart number-one singles